The People's Commissariat for Communications of the USSR was the central state agency of the Soviet Union for communications in the period 1932 to 1946. The Commissariat administered the postal, telegraph and telephone services.

History 
The Commissariat was organised on 17 January 1932 by renaming from the People's Commissariat for Posts and Telegraphs of the USSR.

Over the years of the pre-World War II five-year plans (1929–1940), there was a rapid development of the Soviet communication system and industry. High-frequency equipment was introduced for long-distance communication. Use of such equipment allowed to transmit three, four, or 12 telephone calls over a pair of wires or 16 telegrams over a single telephone channel. In 1939, construction of a high-frequency three-channel line between Moscow and Khabarovsk (8,600 km) provided dependable communication between the USSR central regions and the Far East. By late 1940, the Moscow Central Telegraph Office had 22 facsimile lines. In 1941, a 12-channel line between Moscow and Leningrad was put into operation that meant the concurrent transmission of 12 telephone calls over a single pair of wires.

In the 1930s, the rural (intraraion) telephone communication was first set up. In 1940, it reached 70% of the areas under rural soviets, 76.3% of the sovkhozes, and 9.2% of the kolkhozes.

The radio broadcasting network experienced significant expansion. In the early 1930s, the Comintern Radio Station, with a power of 500 kW, was constructed along with a number of other stations with a power of 100 kW each. The receiving network was augmented, while a system for wired broadcasting via rebroadcasting centres was arranged. Regular television programming was initiated in 1939.

During the Great Patriotic War of 1941–1945, steady communication was organised between the General Headquarters of the Supreme Command and the fronts. Soviet postal service administered by the People's Commissariat for Communications of the USSR delivered billions of letters via the postal network and the military postal units of the army in the field. Up to 70 million parcels per month were delivered to the Soviet Army front from the rear under extremely difficult and often very dangerous conditions.

Because of the war time, almost half the telephone offices became inoperative but were restored soon after the war. By 1948, telephone system capacity and number of installed telephone sets exceeded the pre-war level.

In the post-war times, mail service had undergone quantitative and qualitative changes. In 1946, the People's Commissariat for Communications of the USSR was transformed into the Ministry of Communications of the USSR.

Philatelic policy 
The People's Commissariat for Communications of the USSR was responsible for issuing postage stamps. It also sold stamps to philatelic organisations and collectors. By 1939–1940, the revenue from stamp sales through philatelic organisations was significant. In that same year, it secured over 85% of the total income of the Commissariat (or 17.28 million rubles of 19.833 million rubles). The Soviet government was not an exception among the other states in terms of deriving a profit from the postage stamp trade. In fact, many governments around the world developed similar policies for issuing stamps:

List of Commissars 
Over the years, the Commissariat was headed by the following officers:

See also

References

External links 
 
 

Communications
1932 establishments in the Soviet Union
1946 disestablishments in the Soviet Union
Soviet Union, Communications
Communications in the Soviet Union
Soviet 2
Postal history of Russia
Postage stamps of the Soviet Union
Philately of the Soviet Union